Ebi Lake (Mongolian: Ev nuur, Middle Mongolian: Ebi) is a rift lake in Xinjiang Uyghur Autonomous Region in Northwestern China, near the border of Kazakhstan. Lying at the southeast end of the Dzungarian Gate, Ebi Lake is the center of the catchment of the southwestern part of the Dzungarian Basin. The lake previously covered over 1000 km2 (400 miles2) with an average depth of less than 2 meters (6.5 feet). In August 2007, the Chinese government designated the adjoining Aibi Lake wetland as a National Nature Reserve.

The high salt concentration (87 g/L) of its water prevents plants and fish from living in the actual lake, though many kinds of fish do live in the mouths of its source rivers.

The lake currently covers only 500 km2 surface.

References

External links
Location Maps - Ebi Nur (Ebi lake; Aibi lake)
Lake Ebi

Aibi
Lakes of Xinjiang